Trespena is one of eight parishes in Proaza, a municipality within the province and autonomous community of Asturias, in northern Spain.

Villages
 Bustieḷḷu
 Fabar
 Santa María
 Las Ventas
 El Toral

References

Parishes in Proaza